Nicolae Cseh (1900 – 1950) was a Romanian football midfielder.

International career
Nicolae Cseh played two friendly games for Romania against Turkey, the first one ended with a 2–1 home loss, the second was a 3–1 away victory.

References

1900 births
1950 deaths
Romanian footballers
Romania international footballers
Place of birth missing
Association football midfielders
Liga I players
FC Petrolul Ploiești players